San Fu is one of the 19 constituencies in the Tai Po District.

The constituency returns one district councillor to the Tai Po District Council, with an election every four years. The seat was currently held by Wu Yiu-cheong
of the Neo Democrats.

San Fu constituency is loosely based on private apartments Classical Gardens, Dynasty View and Grand Dynasty View and also villages Kam Shek New Village and Pan Chung New Village in Tai Po with estimated population of 15,444.

Councillors represented

Election results

2010s

2000s

1990s

Notes

References

Tai Po
Constituencies of Hong Kong
Constituencies of Tai Po District Council
1999 establishments in Hong Kong
Constituencies established in 1999